{{Infobox Football club season
| club = Real Salt Lake
| image = Real Salt Lake tertiary wordmark color.svg
| season = 2008
| stadium = Rice-Eccles Stadium (until Oct 9) Rio Tinto Stadium (from Oct 9)
| league = Major League Soccer
| league result = 
| chrtitle   = Owner
| chairman   = SCP Worldwide
| largest win = RSL 4-0 DC (4/12)
| largest loss = DC 4-1 RSL (4/26) 
| ceo        = 
| mgrtitle   = Coach
| manager    = Jason Kreis
| highest attendance = 26,391(vs Chivas USA, 20 September)| lowest attendance  = 10,333(vs San Jose Earthquakes, 18 May)| average attendance =16,174
| cup1        = MLS Cup Playoffs 
| cup1 result = Conference Finals
| cup2        = 2008 U.S. Open Cup
| cup2 result = N/A| cup3        = Rocky Mountain Cup
| cup3 result = Winners
| pattern_la1 = _RSL_08h
| pattern_b1  = _RSL_08h
| pattern_ra1 = _RSL_08h
| pattern_sh1 = _RSL_08h
| pattern_so1 = _RSL
| leftarm1    = FFFFFF
| body1       = FFFFFF
| rightarm1   = FFFFFF
| shorts1     = FFFFFF
| socks1      = 000060
| pattern_la2 = _RSL_08a
| pattern_b2  = _RSL_08a
| pattern_ra2 = _RSL_08a
| pattern_sh2 = _TROFEO_ONWHITE
| pattern_so2 = _3_stripes_on_white2
| leftarm2    = FFFFFF
| body2       = FFFFFF
| rightarm2   = FFFFFF
| shorts2     = 000060
| socks2      = 000060 
| American = true
| prevseason = 2007
| nextseason = 2009
}}

The 2008 Real Salt Lake Season was the fourth season of the team's existence. It was the first season that the team made it to the MLS Cup Playoffs, thanks to some last minute heroics by Yura Movsisyan. After defeating Chivas USA in the first round of the playoffs, Real Salt Lake lost to New York Red Bulls in the Western Conference finals. The 2008 season was also the last season that Real Salt Lake played at Rice-Eccles Stadium, as they moved to the soccer-specific Rio Tinto Stadium on October 9, 2008.

 Squad 

First TeamAs of November 15, 2008''

Formation

Starting XI vs. New York on November 15, 2008

Results

League table
Conference

Overall

Summary

Regular season

March

April

May

June

July

August

September

October

MLS Playoffs

Kits

References 

http://soccernet.espn.go.com/team/stats?teamId=4771&season=2008&cc=5901&leagueId=19&league=usa.1&seasontype=1

External links 

Real Salt Lake Season, 2008
Real Salt Lake
Real Salt Lake seasons